The 2008 Northern Ireland Trophy was a professional ranking snooker tournament that took place between 24 and 31 August 2008 at the Waterfront Hall in Belfast, Northern Ireland.

Ronnie O'Sullivan claimed his 21st ranking tournament by defeating surprise finalist Dave Harold 9–3 in the final.

Tournament summary

Notable comebacks in the qualifiers included: Li Hang coming from 0–4 down to beat Irish prodigy David Morris 5–4, and both Jimmy White and Ian Preece came from 2–4 behind to win their matches 5–4, against Jamie Jones and Paul Davies respectively.
Jimmy White qualified for the final stage of an event for the first time in over a year, stretching back to the 2007 China Open.
Long standing top-16 players, Mark Williams, Ken Doherty and Stephen Lee were playing in the qualifiers for the first time in over a decade.
Last year's runner-up, Fergal O'Brien fell at the first hurdle, losing 3–5 to Michael Holt.
In his match against Mark Selby, Andrew Higginson was playing in front of the TV cameras for the first time since his run to the final of the 2007 Welsh Open.
Dominic Dale came from 1–4 down against Mark Allen to level at 4–4, before Allen played superbly to take the decider.
In beating Ding Junhui 5–4, Mark Davis secured one of the best wins of his career.
Ronnie O'Sullivan won three quick consecutive frames to oust former world champion Ken Doherty 5–4 in the last 32.
Stephen Maguire won the last three frames to beat Alan McManus 5–4, a player who had not reached the last 16 of an event the previous season.
Dave Harold beat Stephen Lee 5–4, a player who had been considered one of the tournaments in-form players, having knocked in three centuries, including a high break of 145.
Harold increased his head-to-head record to 3–0 over Stephen Maguire by beating him 5–2 in the quarter-finals, afterwards Maguire stated that he never seems to perform against Harold.
Barry Hawkins produced a brave fightback to recover from 1–4 to level at 4–4 against Ronnie O'Sullivan in their quarter-final match, before the world champion took the decider.
Dave Harold led John Higgins 5–1, but won only 6–4, to reach his first ranking final since 1994, the gap between those two ranking finals is the longest in snooker history.

Prize fund
The breakdown of prize money for this year is shown below: 

Winner: £30,000
Runner-up: £15,000
Semi-final: £7,500
Quarter-final: £5,600
Last 16: £4,000
Last 32: £2,500
Last 48: £1,625
Last 64: £1,100

Stage one highest break: £500
Stage two highest break: £2,000
Stage one maximum break: £1,000
Stage two maximum break: £20,000
Total: £200,500

Main draw

Final

Qualifying

Qualifying for the tournament took place at Pontins in Prestatyn, Wales between 15 and 17 August 2008.

Century breaks

Qualifying stage centuries

130, 114  James McBain
128, 114  Stuart Pettman
127  Andy Hicks
127  Liang Wenbo
126  Liu Song
125  Adrian Gunnell
121  Andy Lee

120  Jamie Burnett
119  Ricky Walden
111  Stephen Lee
109  Ian Preece
108  Mark Davis
101  Rodney Goggins
101  Robert Milkins

Televised stage centuries

145, 116, 111  Stephen Lee
139, 110  Ian McCulloch
134, 126, 115, 111  Barry Hawkins
134  Michael Judge
134  Ryan Day
132, 122, 110, 110, 108, 103  Ronnie O'Sullivan
127  Stephen Maguire

113  Anthony Hamilton
106  Mark Allen
106  Ali Carter
104  Liang Wenbo
103  John Higgins
103  Ricky Walden

References

Northern Ireland Trophy
Northern Ireland Trophy
Trophy
Northern Ireland Trophy